Bila Tserkva is a city in the center of Ukraine, the largest city in Kyiv Oblast (after Kyiv, which is the administrative center, but not part of the oblast), and part of the Right Bank. It serves as the administrative center of Bila Tserkva Raion and hosts the administration of Bila Tserkva urban hromada, one of the hromadas of Ukraine. Its population is approximately 

The ancient city of Bila Tserkva was founded in 1032 to provide important defenses against nomadic tribes. In the 13th century, it was invaded by the Mongols, however, and the city was devastated. In 1651, it was the site of an important battle between the warring Zaporozhian Cossack Army (and their Tatar allies) and the Polish–Lithuanian Commonwealth, but Bila Tserkva was also where they made peace, and signed a Treaty. In 1791, Russia's Catherine II included Bila Tserkva in the region that came to be known as the Pale of Settlement, which encompassed parts of seven contemporary nations, including large swaths of modern-day Ukraine.

Architecturally, the town is known for a variety of late 18th and early 19th-century buildings, courtesy of the Branickis, who ruled there during this era. Highlights include: The Winter Palace on the bank of the Ros River, the Summer Palace, an ensemble of postal station buildings, the Church of Saint John the Baptist (1789–1812), the Transfiguration Cathedral (1833–9), and the Church of Saint Mary Magdalene (1843). The Church of Saint Nicholas, whose construction was initiated by Hetman Ivan Mazepa and Colonel Kostiantyn Maziievsky in 1706, and was finally completed in 1852.By the late 19th century, Jews would comprise nearly half the population of the city. An important Jewish center, it also evolved into an active center for the exchange of influential ideas about politics, religion, art, and culture, with an active Zionist movement, an active branch of the Decembrist movement and a branch of the Society of United Slavs formulating "plans to assassinate Tsar Alexander I." A center of Hassidim, it also hosted vigorous factions arguing for assimilation. Home to many artists and writers, Sholem Aleichem and Shaye Shkarovsky spend periods writing there in Yiddish, and Ivan Nechuy-Levytsky was also writing in Ukrainian during this era.

An important regional center during Lithuanian and, later, Polish rule, the city remained prominent due to its close proximity to Kyiv, and its place at the center of Europe's "breadbasket," with some of the continent's most fertile land. The city economy first began diversifying in the late 1700s when the Oleksandriia Dendrological Park was first built. In 1809–14, Market Stalls were created to provide space for 85 merchants at a time when the grain trade and sugar industry also began to contribute to the growth of the city. By 1850, Bila Tserkva had built its first major factory. Later, it specialized in building machines for everything from the production of feed for livestock, to tires, to clothing." In 1929, the Bila Tserkva National Agrarian University was founded in as a scientific research center, which now specializes in academic research focusing on environmental protection, veterinary welfare and biosafety.

During the first two decades of the 20th century, the city's Jewish residents were subject to multiple pogroms. In 1919 and 1920 alone, pogroms were responsible for the deaths of 850 Jews. In 1932–1933, as many as 22,000 of greater Bila Tserkva's residents died in the Holodomor.

During the Second World War, the city was occupied by Nazi Germany as part of Operation Barbarossa, resulting in the 1941 massacre of the city's Jewish population. The city was recaptured by Soviet forces and returned to the control of the Ukrainian Soviet Socialist Republic in 1944. In 1991, Ukraine declared independence.

History

Founded in 1032, the city was originally named Yuriiv by Yaroslav the Wise, whose Christian name was Yuri. The contemporary name of the city, literally translated, is "White Church" and may refer to the white-painted cathedral (no longer extant) of medieval Yuriiv. In its long history, Bila Tserkva spent its first few hundred years privately owned, later, though the owner was typically a citizen of the ruling empire, it was organized as a fiefdom.

From its earliest incarnation, however, Bila Tserkva was considered to provide important defense against nomadic tribes that included both the Cumans and the Tatars. Its defenses failed during a 13th-century Mongol invasion, however, and the city was devastated.

Lithuanian and Polish rule 
From 1363, Bila Tserkva belonged to the Grand Duchy of Lithuania, and from 1569 to the Polish–Lithuanian Commonwealth, administratively in the Powiat of Kyiv, part of Lesser Poland. It was crown property, but in recognition of his great service, it was granted to the Castellan of Kraków, Janusz Ostrogski. The next owner was Stanisław Lubomirski (1583–1649) and during his time the town was granted Magdeburg Rights by Sigismund III Vasa in 1620.

After subduing the rebellious Cossacks in the 1626 Battle of Bila Tserkva, the next owner of the estate was Prince Jerzy Dymitr Wiśniowiecki. The castle was successfully taken by Bohdan Khmelnytsky in 1648. In 1651, it was also the site of the Battle of Bila Tserkva between the warring Zaporozhian Cossack Army (and their Tatar allies) and the Polish–Lithuanian Commonwealth, but Bila Tserkva was also where they made peace, and signed a Treaty. In 1666, six-thousand Muscovite troops laid siege to Bila Tserkva. The standoff lasted until the following year when Polish reinforcements led by Jan Stachurski with the aid of allied Cossacks and Iwan Brzuchowiecki smashed Petro Doroshenko's stranglehold.

The next owner was Great Crown Hetman Stanislaw Jan Jabłonowski. In 1702, the castle was taken by the Cossack leader, Semen Paliy who made it his domain. In 1708, the town was overrun by prince Golitsyn's Russian army. The next owner of the town was Jan Stanislaw Jabłonowski, then Stanisław Wincenty Jabłonowski who erected a catholic church. After him ownership passed to Jerzy August Mniszech. The town was substantially refortified.

In 1774, Bila Tserkva (Biała Cerkiew), then the seat of the sub-prefecture (Starostwo), came into the possession of Stanisław August Poniatowski who that same year granted the property to Franciszek Ksawery Branicki, Poland's Grand Hetman who then built his urban residence, the Winter Palace complex and a country residence with the "Oleksandriia" Arboretum (named after his wife Aleksandra Branicka). He founded the Catholic Church of John the Baptist, and started construction of the Orthodox church, which was completed by his successor, his son Count Władysław Grzegorz Branicki. The latter also built the gymnasium-school complex in Bila Tserkva. Aleksander Branicki, the youngest grandson of the hetman, renovated and finished Mazepa's Orthodox church. Under the rule of count Władysław Michał Branicki, Bila Tserkva developed into a regional commercial and manufacturing centre.

The Russian Empire 
In 1791, Russia's Catherine II, included Bila Tserkva in the region that came to be known as the Pale of Settlement, which encompassed parts of seven contemporary nations, including large swaths of modern-day Ukraine. Bila Tserkva was formally annexed into the Russian Empire as a result of the Second Partition of Poland in 1793. Meanwhile, after 1861, the Czarist authorities converted Roman Catholic churches into Orthodox Churches. By the late 18th century, however, Jews were already living in the region, and within a century they would comprise nearly half the population of the city. An important Jewish city, as a result, by the early 1900s it was a fount of idea about politics, religion, art, and culture, with an active Zionist movement, an active branch of the Decembrist movement and a branch of the Society of United Slavs formulating"plans to assassinate Tsar Alexander I by Sergei Muravev-Apostol and his co-conspirators." Home to many artists and writers, Sholem Aleichem and Shaye Shkarovsky were both writing in Yiddish, with Ivan Nechuy-Levytsky writing in Ukrainian. It also was the home of artists like Luka Dolinski and Halyna Nevinchana; as well as theater and film directors Eugene Deslaw and Les Kurbas..

Soviet rule and Nazi occupation 
22,000 residents of the city and its environs died under the Soviet Famine-Genocide of 1932–3.

During World War II, Bila Tserkva was occupied by the German Army from 16 July 1941 to 4 January 1944. In August 1941 Bila Tserkva was the site the Nazi massacre, now known as the Bila Tserkva massacre of the city's Jewish population, which required the separate executions of nearly 100 children. A Monument to Jewish Children and the Holocaust was unveiled in Bila Tserkva in 2019.

Independent Ukraine
Until 18 July 2020, Bila Tserkva was incorporated as a city of oblast significance and served as the administrative center of Bila Tserkva Raion even though it did not belong to the raion. In July 2020, as part of the administrative reform of Ukraine, which reduced the number of raions of Kyiv Oblast to seven, the city of Bila Tserkva was merged into Bila Tserkva Raion.

Jewish history 

"In Jewish folklore the city came to be "referred to as the "Black Abomination" (Yid. Shvartse Tume), a play on its name in Russian ("White Church")." The earliest Jewish inhabitants have been traced to 1648. The population, however, has risen and fallen due to outbreaks of violence and, later, pogroms. By the end of the 19th century, Jews made up a slight majority of the population at 52.9% of the city's total population, or 18,720 total inhabitants. According to the Jewish Virtual Library, in 1904, Jews owned 250 workshops and 25 factories engaged in light industry employing 300 Jewish workers." Cossack-led attacks, Stalin's purges, pogroms and the Holocaust, including the horrors of the Bila Tserkva massacre, caused a major demographic shift. By 2001, it was mostly inhabited by ethnic Ukrainians, with a meager Jewish population of less than 0.1%.

In the late 1980s, Kyiv's Judaica Institute began taking form"after the tragic decades of Bolshevik repressions, Nazi genocide of the Jewish people, and bans on Jewish studies" to research and "popularize the past and the present of the Jewish community of Ukraine."

In 1991, Ukraine declared independence, and two years after the 2014 Revolution of Dignity, Volodymyr Groysman became Ukraine's first Jewish prime minister. Three years later, Ukraine elected Volodymyr Zelenskyy as its first Jewish president. A 2017 Pew Research study found that Ukraine was the most accepting of Jews among all Central and Eastern European countries, a later research study in 2019 confirmed those results.

Economy 
The city economy first began diversifying in the late 1700s, when Alexandra Branicki, the wife of the Polish King Franciszek Ksawery Branicki had a 400-hectacre landscaped park designed. The Oleksandriia Dendrological Park is now a part of Ukraine's National Academy of Sciences, and it currently cultivates more than 1,800 endemic and exotic plant species, with more than 600 species of exotic trees and shrubs alone, in addition to publishing academic research. By 1850, Bila Tserkva had built its first major factory. Later, it "began to specialize in building machines for the production of feed for livestock, electrical capacitors, tires, rubber-asbestos products, shoes, clothing, furniture, and reinforced-concrete products." Industry in the city includes Railway Brake product manufacturers "Tribo Rail", Tribo plant and a major automobile tire manufacturer "Rosava".

Education

Education in Bila Tserkva is provided by many private and public institutions. Its best known is the Bila Tserkva National Agrarian University was founded in 1929 as a scientific research center publishing academic studies on modern agrobiotechnology, nature and environmental protection; the latest technologies for processing livestock products; biosafety, the veterinary welfare of livestock; regulation of bioresources and sustainable nature management; rationalization of social development of rural areas; economics of agro-industrial complex, legal sciences, linguistics and translation. They partner with institutions of higher learning worldwide, and participate in programs with Erasmus+, the British Council, NATO and Fulbright, among several others.

Sports 
During the Cold War, the town was host to the 72nd Guards Krasnograd Motor Rifle Division and the 251st Instructor Heavy Bomber Aviation Regiment of Long Range Aviation. The city is also home to football team FC Ros Bila Tserkva. Ros is a team in the lower levels of the Football Federation of Ukraine: Kyiv Oblast Football Championship. The city is also home to hockey club Bilyi Bars, that plays on Bilyi Bars Ice Arena, built by Kostyantyn Efymenko Charitable Foundation.

Landmarks 
A historical landscape park Arboretum Oleksandriya of 400 acres is situated in Bila Tserkva. It was founded in 1793 by the wife of Polish Hetman Franciszek Ksawery Branicki.
Notable buildings include the Merchant Court (1809–1814) and the Post Yard (1825–31).
There are also Palladian wooden buildings of the Branicki "Winter Palace" and, once, the District Nobility Assembly, prior to a fire.
St. Nicholas Church was started in 1706 by Ukrainian Hetman Ivan Mazepa, but not completed until 1852.
The Orthodox Saviour's Transfiguration Cathedral was constructed in 1833–1839.
The Roman Catholic St. John the Baptist Church dates to 1812.
The St. Mary Magdalene Church was completed in 1846 by Count Branicki.
The building of the mid-19th century Great Choral Synagogue is preserved. Today it is the Technology and Economic College of Bila Tserkva National Agrarian University.
The Shukhov Water Tower, a tower that supports a water tank was built according to a project of Vladimir Shukhov, a Russian engineer-polymath, scientist and architect.

Churches

Synagogues

City sites

Transportation

Airports
Domestic transport and private flights provide services via Bila Tserkva Airport (UKBC), which is located southwest of the city in Hayok district.

Bila Tserkva Air Base is located nearby.

Rail

Ukrzaliznytsia provides railway transit to surrounding areas in Kyiv Oblast and the rest of Ukraine.

There are two railway stations in Bila Tserkva:
Bila Tserkva railway station
Rotok railway station

Public transit
Bila Tserkva has six trolleybus lines.

Bridges
Bila Tserkva is the location of a few large bridges, two of which cross the Ros River.

Notable people
 Sholem Aleichem (1859–1916) – leading Yiddish author and playwright. The Fiddler on the Roof musical is based on his stories.
 David Bronstein (1924–2006) – leading chess grandmaster and writer
 Mother Elżbieta Róża Czacka (1876–1961) – philanthropist and nun, born in Bila Tserkva, and beatified in 2021
 Eugene Deslaw (1898–1966) – avant-garde French cinema director, also known for introducing the Boy Scouts to Ukraine
 Luka Dolinski (1750–1830) – painter, representative of the late Ukrainian Baroque, Rococo and Classicism, educated at the Academy of Fine Arts Vienna
 Volodymyr Dyudya (born 1983) – professional Ukrainian cyclist
 Kostyantyn Efymenko (born 1975) – president of Biofarma, Chairman of Tribo
 Mikhail Eisenstein (1867-1920, born as Moisey Eisenstein) - civil engineer, designer many of the best-known Art Nouveau buildings of Riga, Latvia, and the father of Soviet film director Sergei Eisenstein
 David Goodman, father of Benny Goodman – American jazz and swing musician, clarinetist and bandleader; widely known as the "King of Swing"
 Axel Firsoff (1910–1981) – British astronomer, born in Bila Tserkva
 Boris Samoilovich Iampol'skii (1912–1972) – Russian-language writer
 Andrzej Klimowicz (1918–1996) – operative for Zegota, the government-supported resistance group, organized to help Jews in Nazi-occupied Poland. They are said to have saved tens of thousands from 1942 to 1945.
 Les Kurbas (1887–1937) – movie and theater director, co-founder of Soviet theater avant-garde and a prominent figure of the Executed Renaissance
 Yuri Linnik (1915–1972) – Soviet mathematician
 Ivan Mazepa (1639–1709) – Hetman of Zaporizhian Host from 1687 to 1708
 Olexandr Medvid' (born 1937) – Soviet Belarusian wrestler
 Halyna Nevinchana (born 1957) – painter, writer, journalist
 Ivan Nechuy-Levytsky (1838–1918) – writer, ethnographer, folklorist, teacher
 Lyudmila Pavlichenko (1916–1974) – World War II Soviet sniper. Credited with 309 kills, she is regarded as one of the top military snipers of all time and the most successful female sniper in history.
 Pavlo Popovich (1930–2009) – Soviet astronaut, fourth ever person in outer space, twice Hero of the Soviet Union
 Yossele Rosenblatt (1882–1933) – American cantor
 Shaye Shkarovsky (1891–1945) – Yiddish author
 Yaakov Steinberg (1887–1947) – Yiddish and Hebrew short-story writer, essayist, critic, and translator
 Mikhael Sukernik (1902–1981) – Soviet Russian-Ukrainian chemist who contributed to the development and publication of a Russian-Yiddish dictionary published in 1984

Climate 

Sister cities
 Tarnów, Poland
 Ostrowiec Świętokrzyski, Poland
 Jingzhou, China
 Kaunas, Lithuania
 Kremenchuk, Ukraine
 Braunschweig, Germany

See also
Arboretum Oleksandriya
Bela Crkva, Banat
Battle of Bila Tserkva (1651)
Bila Tserkva Massacre
Bila Tserkva Raion
Bila Tserkva Regiment
Bila Tserkva Together
Great Choral Synagogue
Kyiv Oblast
Treaty of Bila Tserkva

References

External links

Official Bila Tserkva city webportal in Ukrainian
History of Jewish Community in Belaya Tserkov
Kyiv Judaica Institute
Period photos of Bila Tserkva
Images of Arboretum Oleksandriia
Sightseeing in Bila Tserkva

1032 establishments in Europe
Cities of regional significance in Ukraine
Populated places established in the 11th century
Cities in Kyiv Oblast
Kiev Voivodeship
Vasilkovsky Uyezd
 
Cossack Hetmanate
Ukrainian Ashkenazi Jews
Ukrainian Jews
Shtetls
Yiddish-language literature
Yiddish-language folklore
Grand Duchy of Lithuania
Polish–Lithuanian Commonwealth
Russian Empire
20th-century Ukrainian Jews
Ukrainian Jews who died in the Holocaust
Jews who emigrated to escape Nazism
Ukrainian Soviet Socialist Republic
Executed Renaissance